Naig Yusifov (January 5, 1970 – March 24, 1992) was an Azerbaijani soldier and National Hero of Azerbaijan who was killed during the First Nagorno-Karabakh War.

Biography 
Naig Yusifov was born on 5 January 1970 in the village of Agdam in the Tovuz District. In 1987, after graduating from high school, he was called to serve in the Soviet Army. During the period of Naig's military service, there was a tense situation at the borders of Azerbaijan with Armenia; the border regions with Armenia were almost uncontrolled.

Since the National Army was not yet created at that time, only local self-defense battalions were overseeing the area. After completing his military service in the Soviet Army, he joined a self-defense battalion in the village.

Military career 
On March 24, 1992, Armenian soldiers attacked Koxanəbi, a village in the Tovuz District. He came to the village to help rescue soldiers of the Azerbaijani Army who were surrounded. After a fierce battle which lasted for about an hour, he exploded his grenade in order not to be captured by the enemy. As a result of the explosion, nearby Armenian soldiers were also killed.

Memorial 
He was posthumously awarded the title of "National Hero of Azerbaijan" by Presidential Decree No. 833 dated 7 June 1992. He was buried in Agdam village of Tovuz district. The school that he graduated from is named after him.

See also 
 First Nagorno-Karabakh War
 List of National Heroes of Azerbaijan

References

Sources 
Vugar Asgarov. Azərbaycanın Milli Qəhrəmanları (Yenidən işlənmiş II nəşr). Bakı: "Dərələyəz-M", 2010, səh. 227.

1970 births
1992 deaths
Azerbaijani military personnel
Azerbaijani military personnel of the Nagorno-Karabakh War
Azerbaijani military personnel killed in action
National Heroes of Azerbaijan